"Magic" is a song recorded by Australian singer Kylie Minogue for her fifteenth studio album, Disco (2020). It was released as the album's second single by Darenote and BMG on 24 September 2020. Minogue co-wrote the song with Michelle Buzz and Teemu Brunila alongside its producers Daniel Davidsen and Peter Wallevik, collectively known as PhD. "Magic" is a disco-pop song that features an instrumentation consisting of horns, strings, handclaps, and staccato keys. Lyrically, it conveys a hopeful message of a brighter future.

Music critics gave the song positive reviews and some labelled it Minogue's return to club music. Upon its release, "Magic" reached the top-ten on the singles charts in Hungary and Scotland, and became her 57th top-75 hit on the UK Singles Chart. It also peaked at number 17 on the US Hot Dance/Electronic Songs chart. English director Sophie Muller shot the music video for the song; it was filmed at the Fabric club in London and features Minogue dancing accompanied by several dancers. Minogue performed the song on The Graham Norton Show in the UK and The Late Show with Stephen Colbert in the US.

Release
On 21 July 2020, media outlets reported that Kylie Minogue was preparing to release her fifteenth album Disco in the second half of 2020. Following the release of "Say Something", the album's lead single, on 21 September, Minogue used her social media platforms to reveal the name and artwork of the second single, titled "Magic". The cover features Minogue in a retro and technicolor close shot.

The song debuted on The Zoe Ball Breakfast Show on 24 September, and was released onto music services at 8am BST, the same day. The song was released as a single edit, while the album cut alongside "Say Something" appeared with the track on streaming services. The singer promoted the single while doing an interview for Smallzy's Surgery programme, on Australian radio station Nova 96.9.  The Purple Disco Machine remix of "Magic" alongside its extended version was released on 9 October. A  7" vinyl of the song, along with "Till You Love Somebody", a track included on the deluxe edition of Disco, was released on 6 November worldwide.

Composition
"Magic" is a dance-oriented disco and pop song; the album version has a length of four minutes and ten seconds, while the single version lasts for three minutes and thirty-four seconds. Minogue co-wrote the song with Michelle Buzz and Teemu Brunila alongside its producers Daniel Davidsen and Peter Wallevik, collectively known as Ph. D. Davidsen and Wallevik also provided the drum programming and served as the song's engineers; the former also played the guitar, while the latter was responsible for the keyboards. "Magic" features an instrumentation consisting of horns, "funky" strings, "celebratory" handclaps, and staccato keys. Joey Nolfi of Entertainment Weekly described Minogue's vocals as "light-as-a-feather" and noted that the song is a "vintage homage to the groovy glitz and dreamy glamour of 1970s dance floors."

"Magic" is a "cheery" song; lyrically, it provides a hopeful message of a brighter future. According to Jackson Langford of MTV Australia, in the song, Minogue makes the listener believe that in every tragedy, there's a solace, "She grabs you by the hand, whether you want to or not, and forces you to breathe in, take a look at the stars and dance." It begins with Minogue singing the lines, "I feel like anything could happen, the stars look different tonight" before transitioning to the chorus, "Dancing together, ain’t nothing that could be better. Tomorrow don’t matter, we’ll make the night last forеver — so, do you believe in magic?" Idolator's Mike Wass called the song a "three and a half minutes of pure happiness".

Reception

Critical
Robin Murray of music publication Clash called the single "a buoyant, inspired return, an ode to the transformative powers of club culture." Quentin Harrison of Albumism described the single as an homage to German disco group Silver Convention's 1975 song "Fly, Robin, Fly", writing: "the composition for 'Magic' boasts a sublime marriage between melody and groove". Harrison also complimented Minogue's vocals, in particular the "sensuousness of her performance".

Attitude described the track as "a slice of pop magic", noting it "leans more heavily into the funky stylings of the album's genre namesake" than its previous single, "Say Something". Also comparing "Magic" to Minogue's previous single, Vultures Justin Curto felt the track was "lighter fare than shiny lead single 'Say Something' but with a chorus and horn section that still get the job done."

Year-end lists

Commercial
"Magic" debuted at number 75 on the UK Singles Chart and became Minogue's 57th top 75 hit on the chart, peaking at 53 on 13 November 2020. It also peaked at number 2 on the UK Official Singles Sales Chart Top 100 and number 11 on the Official UK Independent Singles Chart. It was more successful on the Scottish Singles Chart where it peaked at number nine. "Magic" debuted at number ten on the Hungarian Single Top 40 chart. It also charted at number 17 on the US Hot Dance/Electronic Songs chart. "Magic" debuted #85 in Finnish airplay chart being her first song to chart since "Into the Blue".

In Wallonia, after spending five weeks in the Ultratip Bubbling Under chart, "Magic" made its way onto the Ultratop chart at number 37 on the issue of 11 November 2020. It marked her first official chart entry in eight years since "Timebomb".

Music video

Minogue revealed in an interview with SiriusXM that the track's music video was directed by English director Sophie Muller, who had previously shot the video for "Say Something". It was filmed at Fabric, a nightclub in Farringdon, London. The video was produced by Chris Murdoch and Juliette Larthe. It premiered on 24 September, on Minogue's official YouTube channel. It features Minogue dancing in the club alongside several dancers and sitting on a throne while wearing a golden jumpsuit. According to Minogue, although Fabric was closed due to the COVID-19 pandemic, she wanted "to give fans a moment of escapism to celebrate on a fantasy dance floor." Josh Martin of NME labeled the video as "vibrant".

Live performances
Minogue performed the song on The Zoe Ball Breakfast Show and The Graham Norton Show on 6 November 2020. The next day, she performed it on her live stream concert Infinite Disco. On 11 November, she performed the song on The Late Show with Stephen Colbert. On 31 December, Minogue performed the song on NBC's New Year's Eve and New Year's Eve Live.

Track listing

Digital download
"Magic" – 4:10

Digital download – single version
"Magic" (single version) – 3:34

Streaming bundle
"Magic" (single version) – 3:34
"Magic" – 4:11
"Say Something" – 3:32

7" vinyl Cat no: 538643871 
 "Magic"
 "Till You Love Somebody"

Purple Disco Machine Remix
 "Magic" (Purple Disco Machine Remix) – 3:35
 "Magic" (Purple Disco Machine Extended Mix) – 5:06

Other Official Remixes
 "Magic" (Nick Reach Up Remix) – 3:10
"Magic" (Nick Reach Up Extended Mix) – 5:36

Credits and personnel
Credits adapted from Tidal.

Kylie Minogue – songwriter, lead vocals, background vocals
Daniel Davidsen – songwriter, producer, drum programmer, engineer, guitar
Peter Wallevik – songwriter, producer, drum programmer, engineer, keyboards
Michelle Buzz – songwriter, background vocals
Teemu Brunila – songwriter
Johny Saarde – drum programmer
Alex Robinson – engineer
Dick Beetham – engineer

Charts

Release history

References

2020 singles
2020 songs
BMG Rights Management singles
Disco songs
Kylie Minogue songs
Music videos directed by Sophie Muller
Music videos shot in London
Songs written by Daniel Davidsen
Songs written by Kylie Minogue
Songs written by Peter Wallevik
Songs written by Teemu Brunila